Arthur Palmer (1807-1881) was an Anglican priest in the  nineteenth century.

Palmer was educated at Trinity College, Dublin. He was Rector of Guelph for 43 years and the first Archdeacon of Toronto.

His son, also called Arthur Palmer, was a classical scholar.

References

Archdeacons of Toronto
Alumni of Trinity College Dublin
1881 deaths
1807 births